The 9th Annual Premios Oye! took place at the new Auditorio Banamex in Monterrey, Nuevo León on November 4, 2010. The nominees were announced on September 3 with Alejandro Fernández receiving 8 nominations.  The voting process is certified by PricewaterhouseCoopers.

Performers
Alejandro Fernández - Cuando Digo Tu Nombre
Ana Torroja - Sonrisa
Banda El Recodo - Dime Que Me Quieres
Banda Los Recoditos - Ando Bien Pedo
Benny Ibarra - Perder Para Encontra
Jotdog - Las Pequeñas Cosas
Koko - Valiente
Lucero - Indispensable
Marco Di Mauro - Nada De Nada
OV7 - Prohibido Quererme
Pedro Fernández - Amarte A La Antigua
Playa Limbo - Los Amantes
Sandoval - Loco Extrano
Sasha Sokol - Dulce Veneno
Victor García - Maldita Luna
Yuri - Tu Eres Para Mi
Jorge Alejandro Fernández - Creo En Ti

Presenters
Fernando Colunga
Paty Cantú
Kika Edgar
Alejandro Garza
Ely Guerra
Benny Ibarra
Lisette
Lisardo
Mauricio Martínez
Vielka Valenzuela
Yurem

Nominees and Winners
Winners in Bold

General Field

Spanish Album of the Year
  Dejarte De Amar — Camila
Mario Domm, producer.
  Dos Mundos / Evolución — Alejandro Fernández
Aureo Baqueiro, Kike Santander & Julio Reyes, producers.
  Métodos De Placer Instantáneo — Aleks Syntek
Aleks Syntek, producer.
  Loba — Shakira
Shakira, producer.
  Primera Fila — Thalía
Aureo Baqueiro, producer.
  Mi destino — Jorge Alejandro Fernández
Jorge Alejandro Fernández, producer.

Spanish Record of the Year
  "Se Me Va la Voz" — Roy Tabare, songwriter (Alejandro Fernández)
  "Aléjate de Mi" - Mario Domm, songwriter (Camila)
  "Mientes" — Mario Domm, Mónica Velez, songwriters (Camila)
  "Colgando En Tus Manos" — Carlos Baute, songwriter (Carlos Baute featuring Marta Sánchez)
  "Cuando Me Enamoro" — Enrique Iglesias & Descemer Bueno, songwriters (Enrique Iglesias featuring Juan Luis Guerra)

Spanish  Breakthrough of the Year
  Mi Niña Bonita — Chino & Nacho
  JotDog — JotDog
  Valiente — Koko
  Marco Di Mauro — Marco Di Mauro
  Lo Que Soñamos Siempre Ser — Sandoval

Pop Field

Best Male Pop
  Dos Mundos / Evolución — Alejandro Fernández  Métodos De Placer Instantáneo — Aleks Syntek
  De Mi Puño y Letra — Carlos Baute
  No Hay Imposibles — Chayanne
  Euphoria — Enrique Iglesias

Best Female Pop
  Único — Alejandra Guzmán
  Loba — Shakira
  Primera Fila — Thalía  Inusual — Yuri
  Nada es Color de Rosa — Yuridia

Best Pop Solo or Duo/Group
  Dejarte De Amar — Camila  Electricidad — Jesse & Joy
  JotDog — JotDog
  Año Perfecto — Playa Limbo
  Lo Que Soñamos Siempre Ser — Sandoval

Rock Field
Best Rock Solo or Duo/Group
  Las Consecuencias — Bunbury
  El Tri 4 Décadas En Vivo — El Tri
  Fuerza Natural — Gustavo Cerati  Otra Cosa — Julieta Venegas
  Poetics — Panda

English
English Album of the Year
  The Element of Freedom — Alicia Keys
Jeff Bhasker, Kerry "Krucial" Brother, Peter Edge, Alicia Keys, Noah "40" Shebib, Swizz Beatz & Al Shux, producers.
  The E.N.D. — The Black Eyed Peas
will.i.am, producer.
  One Love — David Guetta
David Guetta, producer.
  The Fame Monster — Lady GagaVincent Herbert, producer.
  Sticky & Sweet Tour — Madonna
Madonna, producers.

English Record of the Year
  "I Gotta Feeling" — will.i.am, Allan Pineda, Jaime Gómez & Stacy Ferguson, songwriters (The Black Eyed Peas)  "When Love Takes Over" — Kelly Rowland, Miriam Nervo, Olivia Nervo, David Guetta & Frédéric Riesterer, songwriters (David Guetta featuring Kelly Rowland)
  "Alejandro" — Lady Gaga & RedOne, songwriters (Lady Gaga)
  "Bad Romance" — Lady Gaga & RedOne, songwriters (Lady Gaga)
  "This Is It" — Michael Jackson & Paul Anka, songwriters (Michael Jackson)

English Breakthrough of the Year
  'B.o.B
  Justin Bieber
  Ke$ha
  Susan Boyle
  Glee Cast

Popular
Popular Album of the Year
  Dos Mundos / Tradición — Alejandro FernándezJorge Alejandro Fernández, producer.
  Me Gusta Todo de Ti — (Banda el Recodo)
Alfonso Lizárraga, Joel Lizárraga & María de Jesús Lizárraga, producers.
  Clásico — Intocable
Ramón Ayala, producer.
  La Gran Señora — Jenni Rivera
Jenni Rivera, producer.
  Amarte A La Antigua — Pedro Fernández
Homero Patrón, producer.

Popular Record of the Year
  Bandida" — Joan Sebastian, songwriter (Alejandro Fernández)
  Estuve" - Joan Sebastian, songwriter (Alejandro Fernández)
  Me Gusta Todo De Ti — Horacio Palencia, songwriter (La Arrolladora Banda El Limón)
  Ando Bien Pedo — Zapata, songwriter (Banda Los Recoditos)
  Amarte A La Antigua — Yoel Enríquez & José Francisco Lugo Leal, songwriters (Pedro Fernández)Popular Breakthrough of the Year
  Indispensable — Ángel Fresnillo  Up! Norteño — Grupo Pisteador
  Evolución Total — Payabrothers
  Con Ganas De Ti — Selecto

Best Norteño Solo or Duo/Group
  La Jefa — Alicia Villarreal
  Solamente Tú — Duelo
  Clásico — Intocable
  La Granja — Los Tigres del Norte  Desde La Cantina Volúmen 1 — Pesado

Best Grupero Solo or Duo/Group
  Empaca Tus Cosas — Conjunto Primavera
  Pienso En Ti — Grupo Laberinto
  Momentos Y Coincidencias — La Firma
  Raíces — Liberación
  Cuando Amar Duele — Víctor GarcíaBest Ranchero Solo or Duo/Group
  Dos Mundos / Tradición — Alejandro Fernández
  La Gran Señora — Jenni Rivera
  Juan Gabriel — Juan Gabriel
  Amarte A La Antigua — Pedro Fernández  Necesito De Ti — Vicente Fernández

Best Banda/Duranguense Solo or Duo/Group
  Me Gusta Todo de Ti — (Banda el Recodo)  ¡Ando Bien Pedo! — (Banda Los Recoditos)
  Ni Lo Intentes — Julión Álvarez y Su Norteño Banda
  Sold Out Desde Los Angeles, CA. — La Arrolladora Banda El Limón
  Soy Tu Maestro — La Original Banda El Limón

Best Tropical Solo or Duo/Group
  Embrujados de Amor y Cumbia — Aarón Y Su Grupo Ilusión
  Rompiendo Cadenas — Ana Bárbara
  The Last — Aventura   Sin Fecha De Caducidad — Celso Piña
  Me Quedo Contigo — Margarita 'La Diosa De La Cumbia'

Video
Spanish Video of the Year
  ¿Por Qué No Estás Aqui? — Alejandra GuzmánFausto Terán, video director; Fausto Terán, video producer
  Se Me Va la Voz'' — Alejandro Fernández
Gustavo Garzón, video director; Cecilia Sagredo, video producer
  Aléjate de Mí — Camila
Ricardo Calderón, video director
  Mientes — Camila
Ricardo Calderón, video director
  "Colgando En Tus Manos" —  Carlos Baute featuring Marta Sánchez
Luis Álvarez, video director; Luis Álvarez, video producer

Tie between Alejandra Guzmán & Alejandro Fernández.

Theme from a Telenovela, Movie or T.V. Series
Spanish Theme of the year
  Hasta Que El Dinero Nos Separe — Yoel Enríquez & José Francisco Lugo Leal, songwriters (Pedro Fernández)
Emilio Larrosa, producer (Hasta que el dinero nos separe)
  "Cuando Me Enamoro" — Enrique Iglesias & Descemer Bueno, songwriters (Enrique Iglesias featuring Juan Luis Guerra)
Carlos Moreno Laguillo, producer (Cuando Me Enamoro)
  Loca — Aleks Syntek, songwriter (Aleks Syntek)
José Alberto Castro, producer (Los Exitosos Perez)
  Me Enamoré De Ti — Ángel L. López, Carlos Celles, EFA, Javier Díaz & Paolo Tondo, songwriters (Chayanne)
Salvador Mejía Andrade, producer (Corazón Salvaje)
  "Yo Soy Tu Amigo Fiel" — Aleks Syntek, songwriter (Aleks Syntek featuring Danna Paola)
Disney Pixar, producer (Toy Story 3)
  Que Bonito Amor'' — Vincente Fernández & Jorge Alejandro Fernández, songwriters (Jorge Alejandro Fernández)

Audience Award
  Alejandro Fernández

Best Song with a Message
  Tatiana

Tribute to the artistic
  Lucero

Special Tribute
  Lucho Gatica

References

External links
Premios Oye!

2010 music awards
Prem
Mexican music awards